Asus ZenFone is a series of Android smartphones designed, marketed and produced by Asus. The first-generation ZenFones were announced at the 2014 Consumer Electronic Show in Las Vegas, Nevada. Various models are powered by a series of Intel Atom, Qualcomm Snapdragon, and MediaTek processors. Some ZenFone also features the Zen UI, a user interface from Asus.

First generation (2014)

ZenFone 4 
The ZenFone 4 is the 4-inch WVGA (800×480) TFT display model. The ZenFone 4 features a 1.2 GHz dual-core Intel Atom Z2520 saltwell processor, a 5 MP rear & 0.3 MP front camera and 1 GB RAM. However, ZenFone 4 does not have an LED flash unlike the rest of the models in the ZenFone series.

ZenFone 4.5 
The ZenFone 4.5 is the 4.5-inch WVGA (854×480) TFT display model. Using the same processor as the ZenFone 4 and having 8GB of internal storage, 1GB of RAM and a MicroSD Card Slot supporting up to 64GB Storage, it does have a better rear camera than the ZenFone 4. The phone carries an 8 MP rear camera, and uses the same 0.3MP front camera as the ZenFone 4 does.

ZenFone 5 
The ZenFone 5 is the mid range of the series and includes a 5-inch 1280×720 HD IPS display protected with Corning Gorilla Glass 3. This Zenfone features either a dual-core hyper-threaded (dubbed Multicore) Intel Atom or a quad-core Qualcomm Snapdragon processor, an 8 MP rear and 2 MP front camera.

This phone comes with 2 GB of RAM in comparison to other models and features at a competitive price. However, some of the earlier productions and certain variants of this phone came with 1 GB of RAM.

ZenFone 6 
The ZenFone 6 features a 6-inch 1280×720 IPS display. The ZenFone 6 features a 2 GHz dual-core Intel Atom Z2580 processor, a 13 megapixel rear camera and 2 megapixel front-facing camera. The ZenFone 6 is equipped with 8 GB, 16 GB or 32 GB of internal memory, depending upon the version, external memory of up to 64 GB, and 2 GB of RAM.

Variants

Second generation (2015)

ZenFone 2 

The ZenFone 2 was announced at CES 2015. The flagship phablet model (ZE551ML) launched with Android 5.0 Lollipop running Asus's custom Zen UI and has a 5.5" Full HD (1920×1080) IPS display. The phone is powered by Intel Atom Moorefield SoCs with up to 4 GB of RAM, a first for smartphones. The phone also includes dual MicroSIM card slots, 13/5 MP rear and front cameras, a non-removable 3000 mAh Lithium polymer battery, up to 16/32/64/128 GB of internal storage, and a MicroSD Card slot.

Additionally, Asus announced two other models of the Zenfone 2. The ZE550ML comes with a 5.5" HD (1280×720) IPS display, but otherwise features similar specifications to the ZE551ML. The ZE500CL, the low cost variant, comes with a 5" HD display, an Intel Atom Cloverview CPU, 2 GB of RAM, a single MicroSIM slot, 8/2 MP rear and front cameras, and a 2500 mAh battery.

The ZenFone 2 was launched in Taiwan on March 9, 2015 - followed by India, Japan, Indonesia and Thailand

In July 2015, the ZenFone 2E was released in the United States as an exclusive prepaid AT&T GoPhone.

Deluxe editions was released in September 2015. It is basically a ZE551ML with extended memory and a special back cover dubbed "Illusion Case", which has a 3D polygonal pattern that gives it a more premium look and feel than the original ZE551ML. Other markets offered the Deluxe Special Edition with red bezels, extended 256 GB of memory and Intel Atom Z3590 2.5 GHz processor. Colors offered are white and blue with purple shade, while the special edition available in silver or carbon fiber pattern. It is priced at around $299 for the deluxe edition and $469 for the special edition.

The ZenFone 2 won the 2015 iF product design award for top design in innovation, ergonomics, and functionality.

ZenFone Zoom 

The ZenFone Zoom was announced at CES 2015 and along with the ZenFone 2, is one of the first phones to offer 4 GB of RAM. The specifications are largely the same as the Zenfone 2, with the exception of the camera. It has a 13 MP at the rear along with 3× optical zoom and 12× digital zoom, Real Tone Flash, optical image stabilization and laser auto-focus. It is priced at around US$399 for the 2 GB version.

Variants

Third generation (2016)

ZenFone 3 
Asus unveiled the third generation ZenFone series at Computex Taipei on May 30, 2016. Some devices in the ZenFone 3 series (ZenFone 3 Max, ZenFone 3 Laser, ZenFone 3 Deluxe, and ZenFone 3 Ultra) use an aluminum frame body with no visible antenna lines and feature fingerprint sensors for easy unlocking. Each ZenFone 3 model has its own defining features. The ZenFone 3 uses 2.5D Corning Gorilla Glass on its front and rear panels. The ZenFone 3 Deluxe uses a Super AMOLED display and a Sony rear camera. The ZenFone 3 Ultra features a 4600mAh battery that can double as a powerbank for other devices with a 1.5A output. The ZenFone 3 Laser is notable for its low price, and the ZenFone 3 Max is notable for its large battery. The ZenFone 3, ZenFone 3 Deluxe, and ZenFone 3 Ultra use the USB Type-C connector. The third generation ZenFone series drops Intel while retaining Qualcomm and MediaTek as CPU suppliers.

ZenFone AR 
First unveiled at CES 2017, the ZenFone AR is the first smartphone to support the Tango augmented reality and Google Daydream VR platforms and to be offered with 6 or 8 GB of RAM. The ZenFone AR is equipped with a 23 megapixel camera with optical hardware that takes advantage of Tango applications and extreme performance for gaming and data. The camera module is similar with Nokia N8, C7 and X7.

Variants

Fourth generation (2017) 
Asus announced the fourth generation ZenFone on August 17, 2017. The line will go under the name "ZenFone 4", which was previously used for the 4" and 4.5" variants of the first generation line. The main feature of the flagship ZenFone 4 is its dual lens camera, which enables wide-angle photography.

Variants

Fifth generation (2018)
Asus unveiled the fifth generation ZenFone at the 2018 Mobile World Congress in Barcelona. The ZenFone 5 has a screen size of 6.2" with a 19:9 aspect ratio and bears a resemblance to the iPhone X. According to Asus, the new phone will have 10 new AI features.

Variants

Sixth generation (2019) 

In May 2019, Asus unveiled the ZenFone 6 (Asus 6Z) at a press event in Spain. The ZenFone 6 features a rotating camera in an attempt to reduce bezels and provide an all-screen front. There is a dual camera setup on the phone, which normally resides on the back, but rotates when needed to become a selfie shooter. Asus allows for the rotation of the Liquidmetal camera module to be controlled using a stepper motor. This allows users to stop the rotation midway to take photos at interesting angles and can take automatic panoramas. The company has also added fall-protection for the camera module, which will automatically retract the camera to its base position if the phone detects sudden movement.

The Asus ZenFone 6 prices starts at EUR 499 for the 6 GB + 64 GB variant, going up to 6 GB + 128 GB version will retail at EUR 559, and finally, the top-end 8 GB + 256 GB variant is priced at EUR 599. It was immediately available via the Asus eShop on that day and would start shipping from May 25. Asus has revealed that the phone will be offered in two colours – Midnight Black and Twilight Silver.

The ZenFone 6 was announced to be released in India on 19 June 2019 under the name Asus 6Z, due to a trademark ruling by the Delhi High Court against the sale of products branded "Zen" or "ZenFone" in conflict with Telecare Network India's Zen Mobile.

Variants

Seventh generation (2020) 

Asus revealed the ZenFone 7 and 7 Pro in August 2020 as the first ZenFone devices to support 5G while omitting the audio jack. The 7 is primarily differentiated from the 7 Pro by chipsets and memory options. Both phones retain the previous generation's rotating camera benefiting from a new motor. The module is larger and now houses a triple camera setup with the addition of a 3x zoom telephoto lens. The main sensor has been upgraded to 64 MP and can record video at 8K resolution. The ZenFone 7's display increases to 6.67 inches and switches to an AMOLED panel with a 90 Hz refresh rate. The fingerprint sensor has been repositioned from the back panel to the right edge, and is integrated with the power button. The battery capacity remains the same at 5000 mAh, but has faster 30 W charging. Both run on Android 10 using ZenUI 7.

Variants

Eighth generation (2021) 

On 12 May 2021, ASUS has announced ZenFone 8 (ZenFone 8 Compact) and ZenFone 8 Flip under the slogan "Big on Performance. Compact in Size." They are released later on 13 May 2021, features a Qualcomm Snapdragon 888 5G chipset, with Corning Gorilla Glass 6 (Victus in Compact ver.) protection and they support 5G. Their display design Samsung Super AMOLED screen with 120 Hz (90 Hz in Flip ver.) of refresh rate. ZenFone 8 Flip (also known as ZenFone 8 Pro) retains the current previous generation's camera but with improved performance, similar to ZenFone 8 compact. ZenFone 8 (also known as ZenFone 8 compact, ZenFone 8 mini) returns the cameras back to the same as ZenFone 5 (2018), but has Infinity-O display with 64 MP + 12 MP rear cameras similar to ZenFone 5. It has a 4000 mAh battery and includes IP68 water resistance and a fingerprint sensor on display.

Variants

Ninth generation (2022)

References

External links 

 
 Asus Zenfone 8 Flip Complete Specs

Asus ZenFone
Android (operating system) devices
Mobile phones introduced in 2014
Phablets
Android cameras with optical zoom
Mobile phones with mechanical zoom lens